The 2022 NCAA Division I Women's Tennis Championships were the women's tennis tournaments played from May 6 to May 28, 2022 at campus sites and Champaign, Illinois at the Khan Outdoor Tennis Complex. It was the 40th edition of the NCAA Division I Women's Tennis Championship.

Women's team championship
There were 64 teams selected to the women's team championship, 31 of which were automatic qualifiers from each Division I conference. The remaining 33 teams were selected at-large. Teams played two rounds of single-elimination matches in groups of four from May 6-7 or 7-8 at campus sites; the winners of those regionals advanced to a super-regional round, also held at campus sites. The remaining eight teams advanced to the championship rounds in Champaign, Illinois.

Automatic qualifiers
The following 31 teams were automatic qualifiers, representing their conferences:

National seeds
Sixteen teams were selected as national seeds, and were guaranteed to host for the first two rounds, if they submitted a bid and met criteria.

1.  North Carolina  (semifinals)
2.  Oklahoma  (runner-up)
3.  Duke  (semifinals)
4.  Texas (National Champions)
5.  Virginia  (quarterfinals)
6.  NC State (quarterfinals)
7.  Texas A&M (quarterfinals)
8.  Pepperdine (quarterfinals)
9.  Miami (FL)  (Super Regionals)
10.  Ohio State (second round)
11.  California (Super Regionals)
12.  Oklahoma State (Super Regionals)
13.  Auburn  (Super Regionals)
14.  Georgia  (Super Regionals)
15.  Stanford  (Super Regionals)
16.  Florida (Super Regionals)

Bracket
Bold indicates winner. Host institutions for the first two rounds and Super Regionals are marked with an asterisk (*). 

Bracket source:

Women's singles championship
There were 64 singles players selected to the women's singles championship, 15 of which were automatic qualifiers from each Division I conference with an eligible team ranked in the ITA Top 125. The remaining 49 players were selected at-large. The tournament was played following the team championship from May 23-28 in Champaign, Illinois.

Automatic qualifiers
The following 15 players were automatic qualifiers, representing their conferences:

National seeds
The following sixteen players were seeded for this tournament:

 Emma Navarro (Virginia)
 Peyton Stearns (Texas) (National Champion)
 Petra Hule (Florida State)
 Daria Frayman (Princeton) 
 Cameron Morra (North Carolina)
 Sarah Hamner (South Carolina)
 Eryn Cayetano (USC)
 Carson Branstine (Texas A&M)

Players ranked 9th–16th, listed by last name
 Chloe Beck (Duke)
 Jaeda Daniel (NC State)
 Georgia Drummy (Duke)
 Shiori Fukuda (Pepperdine)
 McCartney Kessler (Florida)
 Mell Reasco (Georgia)
 Irina Cantos Siemers (Ohio State)
 Layne Sleeth (Oklahoma)

Draw
Bracket:

Finals

Section 1

Section 2

Section 3

Section 4

Women's doubles championship
There were 32 doubles teams selected to the women's doubles championship, 10 of whom were automatic qualifiers from each Division I conference with an eligible team ranked in the ITA Top 60. The remaining 22 teams were selected at-large. The tournament was played following the team championship from May 23-28 in Champaign, Illinois.

Automatic qualifiers
The following 10 teams were automatic qualifiers, representing their conferences:

National seeds
The following eight teams were seeded for this tournament:

 Jaeda Daniel / Nell Miller (NC State) (National Champions)
 Elizabeth Scotty / Fiona Crawley (North Carolina)
 Emma Navarro / Hibah Shaikh (Virginia)
 Carol Lee / Kate Sharabura (Georgia Tech)

Players ranked 5th–8th, listed by institution
 Alicia Herrero Linana / Melany Krywoj (Baylor)
 Tatsiana Sasnouskaya / Yuliia Starodubtseva (Old Dominion)
 Jayci Goldsmith / Tatiana Makarova (Texas A&M)
 Anna Brylin / Brooke Killingsworth (Wake Forest)

Draw
Bracket:

Finals

Top half

Bottom half

References

NCAA Division I tennis championships
NCAA Division I Women's Tennis Championships
NCAA Division I Women's Tennis Championships